Akí (Old Spanish orthography: Rája Aché or Raxa Ache, pronounced Aki), also known as Rája Matandâ ("the Old King") (1480–1572), was commonly referred to as the King of Luzon who ruled from the kingdom's capital Manila, now the capital of the Republic of the Philippines.

While still the Crown Prince of Luzon and the grand admiral for the King of Brunei, Aki married a princess of Brunei in 1521. He was the King of Luzon in 1570 when his nephew, the heir apparent (raja muda) Sulayman together with Banaw, Lakan Dula, the lord of Tondo, engaged in a battle with the Martin de Goiti naval detachment to Luzon augmented by Cebuano military volunteers and part of the Legaspi expedition of Spain commissioned from New Spain to find the Maluku Islands. This battle resulted in the fall of Manila and the capture of 13 pieces of Luzonian artillery.

Biography

Early life 
Among the Spanish accounts of Ache's capture, that of Rodrigo de Aganduru Moriz is considered among those which extensively record Ache's statements. Details of Ache's early life are thus usually based on the Aganduru Moriz account.

According to this document, Ache's unnamed father died when he was still very young, and his mother acceded as ruler of Maynila. In the meantime, Ache was raised alongside his cousin, the ruler of Tondo, and this person is identified by some to be Bunao Lakandula.

During this time, the "young prince" Ache realized that his mother was being "slyly" taken advantage of by his cousin, the ruler of Tondo, who was encroaching on territory belonging to Maynila. When Ache asked his mother for permission to address this matter, she refused and told him to keep his peace.

Ache could not accept this, and thus left Maynila with some of his late father's trusted men to see his "grandfather", the Sultan of Brunei, and request assistance. The Sultan responded by giving Ache a position as commander of his naval forces. Pigafetta noted that Ache was "much feared in these parts", but especially by the non-Muslims, who considered the Sultan an enemy potentate. He was a strict enforcer of Islamic rule in Brunei and the Philippines as he waged war against Tondo. The Sultan commended him for successfully sacking the Buddhist city of Loue in southwest Borneo, which adhered to the old religion and resisted the authority of the Sultanate.

Encounter as Crown Prince of Luzon with Sebastian Elcano, an expeditionary captain for Spain (1521) 
Aganduru Moriz recounts that in 1521, Ache was in command of the Bruneian fleet when they chanced upon what remained of the Magellan expedition, under the command of Sebastian Elcano, somewhere off the southeastern tip of Borneo. Rizal notes that Ache had just won a naval victory at the time, and Rizal and Dery both say Ache was on his way to marry a cousin – a ritual which Scott describes as the usual way that nobles at that time gained influence and power. (Luciano PR Santiago notes that this practice helps explain the close interrelationships among the ruling houses in Manila, Brunei and Sulu.)

Dery notes that Ache's decision to attack must have been influenced by a desire to bring Elcano's ship back to Manila bay, for use as leverage against his cousin, the ruler of Tondo.

Elcano, however, was able to defeat Ache. As a result, Ache was captured and brought onboard Elcano's ship. According to Scott, Ache was eventually released after a ransom was paid.

Reign (until 1570) 
Sometime between 1521 and 1570, Ache succeeded his mother and became Paramount Datu of Maynila, assuming the title of Rajah.

By the time of the next historical accounts on Ache in 1570, his co-ruler was his nephew, Sulayman, who also held the title of Rajah. This situation, with Maynila seeming to be a diarchy, has been interpreted by scholars in different ways. Luis Cámara Dery says that by the time De Goiti arrived in 1570, Rajah Matanda had already ceded authority to his nephew and heir apparent, Rajah Sulayman, while still retaining considerable influence. According to William Henry Scott, however, Rajah Sulayman was not proclaimed paramount ruler until Rajah Matanda's death in 1572.

Meeting Martin de Goiti, a field marshal for the Legaspi expedition of Spain, and witnessing the fall of Manila (1570) 

By the late 1560s, Miguel López de Legazpi was already searching for a more suitable place to establish the Spanish colonial capital, having found first Cebu and then Iloilo undesirable because insufficient food supplies and attacks by Portuguese pirates. He was in Cebu when he first heard about a well-supplied, fortified settlement to the north, and sent messages of friendship to its ruler, Rajah Matanda, whom he addressed as "King of Luzon." In 1570, Legazpi put Martín de Goiti in command of an expedition north to Manila and tasked him with negotiating the establishment of a Spanish fort there.

When the forces of de Goiti arrived in 1570, they were initially welcomed by Rajah Matanda. But just as Matanda was receiving de Goiti on the shore, Rajah Sulayman and his party arrived, taking on a much more aggressive stance towards the foreigners. De Goiti began negotiating with Matanda and Sulayman so that the Spanish could set up their base of operations in Manila, but negotiations dragged on for several days.

As negotiations broke down, a misunderstanding between the two parties resulted in Sulayman's forces believing they were under attack, and retaliating against de Goiti's shore party. In the ensuing battle, the fortified city of Manila was burned down, and de Goiti's party temporarily overtook Maynila.

Outnumbered and fearing that a shift in seasonal winds would trap him in Manila, de Goiti decided to sail back to Legazpi instead of pressing his advantage.

Meeting Miguel Lopez de Legaspi, an admiral for Spain (1571) 

The following year, Legazpi himself arrived in Manila. He was welcomed first by Lakandula of Tondo and then by Rajah Matanda. Fearing his presence would exacerbate the conflict between Maynila and the Spanish, Sulayman did not meet with Legazpi face to face until later. The rulers of Maynila and Tondo eventually cut a deal with Legazpi, which allowed him to claim Maynila for the crown of Spain, and the Spanish city of Manila was born in June 1571.

Death (1572) and succession 
In August 1572, Rajah Matanda fell ill and requested to be baptised into the Catholic Church. In the same year, he succumbed to his illness.

Before he died, Legazpi granted Rajah Matanda's wish that Rajah Sulayman be declared Paramount ruler of Maynila. The unnamed author of the "Anonymous 1572 Relacion" (translated in Volume 3 of Blair and Robertson) explains that this was in keeping with indigenous laws, which allowed inheritances to be passed on to "legitimate" children. While Rajah Matanda did in fact have children, they were not born of his "legitimate wife". The unnamed author of the relacion, explaining the custom as he understood it, says:

Descendants 
According to archival research of historian Luis Camara Dery, Rajah Matanda had at least two sons and one daughter: Don Ambrocio Mag-isa Ladyangbata, Don Luis Ylao, and Doña Maria Bolactala.

Dery theorizes that unlike their father who had befriended the Spanish, these siblings "appeared to be lukewarm to the Spaniards", so that the privileges and exemptions granted to Matanda's descendants by Legazpi were only claimed by their children and grandchildren – the third (as of 1612) and fourth (as of 1679) generation from Rajah Matanda.

As of 1696, Rajah Matanda's descendants had fallen on hard times, as Dery notes:

Name origin 
Aki is nicknamed "raja matandâ" which means "the old king" in Malayanised Tagalog of the time. In accordance with this, Spanish records also refer to him as Raja Ache el Viejo (King Ache the Old). 

He is also sometimes referred to as Raja Laya, a name that some historians propose to have been derived from an intermediate appellation Ladyang Matanda – a Tagalog approximation of his title.

Sources 
Events in Rajah Matanda's life are documented by two different sets of firsthand Spanish accounts.

The better known set of accounts takes place in 1571–72, when the forces of Martin De Goiti, and later Miguel De Legazpi himself, arrived in Manila Bay. These are described in the numerous accounts of the Legazpi expedition, including those by the expedition's designated notary Hernando de Riquel, and by Legazpi himself.

Less known are the accounts of the Magellan Expedition in 1521, by which time Magellan had already been killed and Sebastian Elcano had taken over command of the expedition. These accounts describe how Ache, then serving as commander of naval forces for the Sultan of Brunei, was captured by the men Sebastian Elcano.  These events, and the details Ache's interrogation were recorded in accounts of Magellan and Elcano's men, including expedition members Rodrigo de Aganduru Moriz, Gines de Mafra, and the expedition's scribe Antonio Pigafetta.

Additional details about Raja Matanda are sometimes derived from genealogical accounts which mention him, but these focus on Ache's genealogy, and so do not provide details about specific events.

See also

Rajahnate of Maynila
Rajah
Datu
Lakan
Philippine revolts against Spain
Hinduism in the Philippines

References

 
 

Filipino paramount rulers
Hinduism in the Philippines
16th-century conflicts
16th-century monarchs in Asia
Converts to Roman Catholicism from Islam
Filipino datus, rajas and sultans
Filipino former Muslims
Filipino Roman Catholics
Paramilitary Filipinos
People from Manila
People of Spanish colonial Philippines
History of the Philippines (900–1565)
1572 deaths